The 1987–88 Courage Area League South was the first full season of rugby union within the fourth tier of the English league system, currently known as the National League 2 South, and was the counterpart to Courage Area League South (now National League 2 North). Each team played one match against the other teams, playing a total of ten matches each. There was no set date for matches, clubs having to arrange the fixtures amongst themselves.  Askeans were the first ever champions, gaining promotion to the 1988–89 National Division Three while Streatham-Croydon were the only relegated side, dropping to London 1.

Structure

Each team played one match against each of the other teams, playing a total of ten matches each.  The champions are promoted to National Division 3 and the bottom team was relegated to either London 1 or South West 1 depending on their locality.

Participating teams and locations

League table

Sponsorship
Area League South is part of the Courage Clubs Championship and was sponsored by Courage Brewery.

See also
 National League 2 North

References

N4
National League 2 South